This list includes all British officers of general rank who are listed by the Commonwealth War Graves Commission (CWGC) as having died while serving during the First World War.  During this period general officers were those who held the rank of field marshal, general, lieutenant-general, major-general or brigadier-general and generally commanded units of brigade size or larger.  

A popular view arose in post-war years that British general officers were detached from the fighting in châteaux far behind the front line.  This view has been criticised as a misconception by some military historians. In 1995, British military historians Frank Davis and Graham Maddocks compiled, in the book Bloody Red Tabs, a list of 78 general officers that they considered to have been killed as a result of active service.  This list provided below includes officers who died from all causes and so is broader than Davis and Maddocks' list.  It includes 123 officers who died between Britain's entry into the war, 4 August 1914, and the armistice of 11 November 1918.  Listed separately are 34 who died between the armistice and 31 August 1921 which was defined by an act of British parliament as the formal end of the war.

Background
General officer ranks in the armies of the British Empire of the First World War were, in descending order of seniority: field marshal, general, lieutenant-general, major-general and brigadier-general.  Field marshal was usually an honorary appointment, with the most senior active duty officers being generals.  Generals typically commanded field armies, lieutenant-generals corps, major-generals divisions and brigadier-generals brigades.  At the start of the war the British Army contained 9 field marshals, 19 generals, 28 lieutenant-generals, 114 major-generals and 180 brigadier-generals.  At the end of the war in 1918 the expansion of the army had seen this rise to 8 field marshals, 29 generals, 47 lieutenant-generals, 219 major-generals and 600 brigadier-generals.

Châteaux generals view

There has long been a view that British generals of the First World War were isolated from their men, issuing orders from châteaux far behind the front line with little thought for the reality in the trenches. This view has been criticised by Davis and Maddocks among others. The role of the general officers was not to oversee troops directly but to maintain a headquarters from which they could receive information and direct the battle.  In the early months of the war casualties among British general officers were high; indeed in a period of nine days in late September and early October 1914 eight generals were killed, wounded or captured, a considerable loss of leadership and command experience.  On 3 October 1915 following the loss of three division commanders killed in action in a week, the Chief of the Imperial General Staff Lieutenant-General William Robertson ordered corps and division commanders of the armies on the Western Front not to expose themselves to danger during battle.

One of the most prominent persons to propagate the "chateau generals" view, was wartime Prime Minister David Lloyd George in his 1933 War Memoirs.   The view was advocated by Alan Clark's 1961 book The Donkeys and the 1964 BBC documentary series The Great War.

Since the 1980s military historians including Shelford Bidwell, Tim Travers, John Terraine and Williamson Murray have stated that rather than being châteaux generals who hid in the rear, the British Army leadership of the war were creative innovators, keen to overcome the stalemate of trench warfare.

Causes of death
Historians Frank Davis and Graham Maddocks published, in 1995, Bloody Red Tabs, that attempted to list all British generals killed in action, died of wounds or as a result of active service.  They found 78 general officers in these categories.  Although Maddocks and Davis could not find a conclusive cause of death in some cases they assessed that 34 of the deaths were caused by artillery fire, 22 by small arms fire, three from drowning, four from accidents and one from cholera.  None of the generals were killed in their châteaux (though two were wounded non-fatally there).  The proportion of deaths by shell fire is lower than that for general British Army casualties and a disproportionate number killed by small arms fire, indicating a presence in the front lines. A further 146 generals were either wounded or taken prisoner during the war.

Comparisons
Bailey, Hatton and Inwood (2023) report that, of those who joined the British Army in 1914, 74% of officers and 85% of other ranks survived to the end of the conflict. French commander Ferdinand Foch listed 41 of his generals killed in action during the war, whose names were engraved on a memorial at Les Invalides.  A wider listing of all those mort pour la France by Gerard Gehin for Le Souvenir français gives 81 generals.  French historian Laurent Guillemot working from a definition similar to Foch gives numbers of 76 British, 42 French, 2 Belgian, 2 Italian and 2 Romanian generals killed on the Allied side and around 70 German, 40 Austro-Hungarian and 1 Ottoman on the Central Powers side.

Inclusion criteria
The Commonwealth War Graves Commission list all those who "died while serving in the Commonwealth forces during the war", including those not on active duty, and their records include other general officers not listed by Davis and Maddocks.

Pre-armistice deaths

Field Marshals

Generals

Lieutenant-Generals

Major-Generals

Brigadier-Generals

Post-armistice deaths
The First World War is usually held to have ended with the armistice of 11 November 1918 though the peace treaties officially ending the war took some years to agree and sign. Under the Termination of the Present War (Definition) Act 1918 the end of the war was defined for general purposes by the British parliament as 31 August 1921.  This is the same date that the Commonwealth War Graves Commission uses for its casualty records.  The following generals of the British Empire died between the armistice and 31 August 1921.

Lieutenant-Generals

Major-Generals

Brigadier-Generals

See also 
List of French generals who died during the First World War
List of Royal Navy flag officers who died during the First World War

Notes

References

Bibliography 

Lists of British military personnel
Lists of generals
Lists of people killed in World War I
United Kingdom in World War I